Cati may refer to:

People
 Francisco Cati, Mexican football player
 Pasquale Cati (1550–1620), Italian painter
 Twm Siôn Cati

Places
 Catí, Valencia, Spain
 Cati River, Brazil

Other
 Computer-assisted telephone interviewing

See also
 Caty (disambiguation)
 Kati (disambiguation)